"The One with Monica's Thunder" is the first episode of Friends seventh season. It first aired on the NBC network in the United States on October 12, 2000.

Plot
The episode begins with the gang celebrating Monica and Chandler's engagement, after Ross finally shows up after missing the proposal. Monica suggests that everyone dress up so that they can go to The Plaza for champagne.

Joey announces that he cannot stay out too late as he has a commercial audition in the morning. He is auditioning for the role of a 19-year-old, which is 12 years younger than he is, and his efforts to "de-age" by dressing and acting like a teenager are met with ridicule. Phoebe, on the other hand, would love to sing at the wedding, and badgers Monica until she agrees just to get her to get dressed for the night.

While everyone is getting ready, Monica and Chandler have an intimate moment, but are derailed when Chandler has an incident. Chandler leaves to confide in Joey, and later Rachel, for advice. Rachel herself meets up with Ross in the hallway and asks whether they will themselves marry other people in the future. The topic shifts to their relationship, and Rachel compliments Ross on how good he was in bed. She then says that they never had a "bonus night": two exes who have broken up get back together for one night of "no strings attached" sex. Suddenly, both are tempted by the idea, but Ross tries to tell Rachel that it is not a good idea for them to spend the night together.

However, the next time Monica opens the door, she is shocked to see Ross and Rachel kissing at the threshold. When they try to apologize, Monica accuses Rachel of stealing her thunder, and preempting Monica's big night by getting back together with Ross. The two ex-lovers protest mightily, and Monica is almost convinced when Phoebe comes in, immediately misinterprets the situation and asks if she can sing at Ross and Rachel's wedding too. When Chandler and Joey return, Joey is also delighted at the "reunion", and Monica accuses Rachel of being unable to stand anyone else being in the spotlight. Rachel tries desperately to patch things up, but Monica is not in the mood to listen and cancels out on going to the Plaza.

Chandler follows Monica into the bedroom to calm her down, and they begin to kiss, leading to a resurgence of Chandler's erection, but they are soon interrupted by Phoebe; Joey plants doubts in Phoebe's mind that Monica and Chandler will let them play at their wedding, so she begins demanding her down payment at this point. They refuse, culminating in her picketing their apartment, guitar in hand, over the rest of the episode. No sooner have Chandler and Monica reasserted their privacy, Rachel returns to make amends; unfortunately, this evolves into an even bigger fight, and Rachel storms out, telling Ross to come with her so they can have sex. Ross follows to Rachel's room where she tells him they are not really going to do it, she just wants Monica to think they are. She tries to maintain this illusion when Monica knocks on the door, but Ross refuses to play along. Rachel finally admits that seeing Monica and Chandler get engaged made her feel sad and lonely, and she turned to Ross for sex to feel better about herself; the thunder-stealing was unintentional. The girls make up, and Ross takes off.

During the tag scene, Phoebe sings in the apartment when Chandler comes out of the bedroom having finally had sex with Monica. He gives Phoebe a down payment—one dollar—in exchange for Phoebe singing at their wedding. But when Phoebe starts asking who will perform the ceremony, he takes her guitar.

Reception
In the original broadcast, the episode was viewed by 25.54 million viewers.
Sam Ashurst from Digital Spy ranked it #170 on their ranking of the 236 Friends episodes.
Telegraph & Argus ranked it #9 on their ranking of all 236 Friends episodes.

References

2000 American television episodes
Friends (season 7) episodes